VNUHCM - International University (Ho Chi Minh City International University, Vietnamese: Trường Đại học Quốc tế, Đại học Quốc gia Thành phố Hồ Chí Minh) is the first and unique English-medium public research university in Vietnam. Established in 2003, it is now becoming as one of the leading research powerhouse in Vietnam. The university is affiliated to the Vietnam National University, Ho Chi Minh City (VNU-HCM).

The university conducts all its administrative, academic, and research activities in Thu Duc university village, a 77 hectare joint land endowment between Ho Chi Minh City and Binh Duong Province. It is home to Regional Centre of Expertise on Education for Sustainable Development, a non-profit organisation that works closely with the United Nations and other 136 RCEs to incorporate sustainable development into education.

The teaching is conducted in English. In addition to entrance exams, students also have to write an English language test or obtain TOEFL, TOEIC, IELTS or equivalent English certificate as required by HCMIU and its cooperative universities.

Besides offering undergraduate and postgraduate degree programs in business studies and engineering, HCMIU also offers a number of other courses related to the two fields.

Admission 
Although most of the courses offered at HCMIU are conducted in English, some courses are required to be conducted in Vietnamese as well.

These includes: business administration, finance & banking, logistics, biotechnology, biochemistry, food technology, electrical engineering, automation & control, information technology (computer science engineering), biomedical engineering, civil engineering, industrial systems engineering, space engineering, environmental engineering, financial engineering & risk management (applied mathematics) and English language.

Cooperative and Twinning Programs
A number of the universities in the United States of America, the United Kingdom, Australia, and New Zealand have formed educational partnerships with the university. The students can study at the university for two or three years, followed by two or three years of study abroad. The tuition fee is higher than in other Vietnamese universities. Diplomas will be issued by HCMIU's cooperative universities.

 United States:
 Rutgers, The State University of New Jersey
 Binghamton University
 University of Houston

 United Kingdom:
 The University of Nottingham
 University of the West of England

 Australia:
 The University of New South Wales

 New Zealand:
 Auckland University of Technology

Postgraduate Programs
 Doctor of Biotechnology (Phd in Biotechnology)
 Doctor of Business administration (Phd in Business administration)
 Master of Business Administration (MBA in Finance, Technology Management, Marketing)
 Master of Science in Biotechnology (MSc in Biotechnology)
 Master of Science in Electrical Engineering (MSc in Electrical Engineering)
 Master of Science in Information Management (MSc in Electrical Engineering)
 Master of Science in Biomedical Engineering (MSc in Biomedical Engineering)
 Master of Science in Industrial Systems Engineering (MSc in Industrial Systems Engineering)
 Master of Science in Applied Mathematics (MSc in Applied Mathematics)
 Master of Science in Leadership, joint program with Northeastern University, United States (MSc in Leadership)

Schools and Departments
Currently, International University has 4 schools and 6 departments as listed below:

School of Business
Programs offered:
 Business Administration, with 4 specializations:
 Business Management
 Marketing
 Hospitality - Tourism Management
 International Business
 Finance and Banking, with 2 specializations:
 Corporate Finance
 Banking and Financial Investment

School of Biotechnology
Programs offered:
 Biotechnology, with 4 tracks:
 BioMedical
 Molecular
 Industrial
 Marine and Environmental Science
 Food Technology, with 2 tracks:
 Production Management
 Technology-Engineering
 Aquatic Resource Management, with 2 tracks:
 Management
 Technology
 Chemical Biology

School of Electrical Engineering
Programs offered:
 Electrical Engineering, with the following specializations:
 Electronics and Embedded Systems
 Telecommunication Networks
 Signal Processing
 RF Design
 Automation and Control Engineering

School of Computer Science and Engineering
Programs offered:
 Information Technology, with 3 specializations:
 Network Engineering
 Computer Engineering
 Computer Science

Departments Biomedical Engineering
Programs offered:
 Biomedical Engineering, with 4 tracks:
 Medical Instrumentation
 Biomedical Signal and Image Processing
 Pharmaceutical Engineering
 Regenerative Medicine

Department of Industrial Systems Engineering
Programs offered:
 Industrial Systems Engineering
 Logistics and Supply Chain Management

Department of Civil Engineering
The department offers the program of Civil Engineering.

Department of Physics
The department offer undergraduate program in Space Engineering which specialises in Image Analysis and Remote Sensing. It is responsible for all Physics courses. Its scientific research includes the fields of Galactic Astronomy and Plasma Physics.

Department of Mathematics
The department offers the program of Applied Mathematics with the specialization of Financial Engineering and Risk Management. It is also responsible for other mathematical-related courses.

Department of English
The English Department provides globally standardized language programs to assist students in their studies, which are conducted wholly in English.

Accreditation
The International University has received accreditation from the ASEAN University Network - Quality Assurance (AUN-QA) for the following programs:
 Computer Science (2009)
 Biotechnology (2011)
 Business Administration (2012)
 Electronics and Telecommunications (2013, AUN - DAAD)
 Industrial Systems Engineering (2015)

Student life

Student organizations
Students at the International University run over 15 clubs and organizations, including volunteer groups, academic clubs and common-interest teams. Most organizations are funded and governed by the Youth Union and the Students Union, while a few others are directly run and supported by Schools and Departments.

Youth Union:
 Event Department
 External Relations Department
 Information Department
 Science and Technology Department

Students Union:
 Social Work Team (SWT)
 English Teaching Volunteers (ETV)
 Arts Team (Arteam)
 Enactus IU (formerly SIFE IU)
 Soft Skills Club (SSC)
 ISE Art club (IAC)
 Guitar Club (GC)
 English Club (IEC)
 French Club (FC)
 Sports Club (SC)
 Japan Club
 Korean Club (KYG)

Other organizations:
 Securities Exchange Club (SEC)
 Marketing Club (Martic)
 IT Club (ITC)
 English Speaking Club (ESC)
 IU Buddy (Exchange student support group)

Student accommodation
Students can register for housing services at the following dormitories:
 VNU-HCMC Dormitory
 VNU-HCMC Guest House
 Dormitories in city center: Phan Liem and Ly Van Phuc streets.

Campuses
 IU Main Campus, Thu Duc
 Ground floor, VNU-HCMC Central Library
 IU City Campus, 234 Pasteur, District 3 (old address: 33 Ly Tu Trong, District 1)

Board of Rectors
Rector: A/Prof. Dr. Trần Tiến Khoa, PhD.

Vice Rectors:
 A/Prof. Lê Văn Cảnh, PhD.
 Dr. Hồ Nhựt Quang, PhD.
 A/Prof. Đinh Đức Anh Vũ, PhD.

References

External links
Official Website

Universities in Ho Chi Minh City
Educational institutions established in 2003
2003 establishments in Vietnam